The Hans cabinet was the state government of Saarland between 2018 and 2022, sworn in on 1 March 2018 after Tobias Hans was elected as Minister-President of Saarland by the members of the Landtag of Saarland. It was the 28th Cabinet of Saarland.

It was formed after the resignation of Minister-President Annegret Kramp-Karrenbauer, and was a continuation of the grand coalition government of the Christian Democratic Union (CDU) and Social Democratic Party (SPD) formed after the 2017 Saarland state election. Excluding the Minister-President, the cabinet comprised six ministers. Three were members of the CDU and three were members of the SPD.

The Hans cabinet was succeeded by the Rehlinger cabinet on 25 April 2022.

Formation 
The previous cabinet was a grand coalition government of the CDU and SPD led by Minister-President Annegret Kramp-Karrenbauer of the CDU. She announced her switch to federal politics after being nominated as general-secretary of the federal CDU in February 2018. The same day, CDU parliamentary leader Tobias Hans was nominated as her successor. Kramp-Karrenbauer formally resigned as Minister-President two days later.

Hans was elected as Minister-President by the Landtag on 1 March, winning 40 votes out of 51 cast.

Composition

External links

References 

Politics of Saarland
State governments of Germany
Cabinets established in 2018
Cabinets disestablished in 2022
2018 establishments in Germany
Cabinets of Saarland